"Animals" is a song by British metalcore band Architects. Produced by the band's drummer Dan Searle and lead guitarist Josh Middleton, it is featured on the group's 2021 ninth studio album For Those That Wish to Exist. The track was released as the lead single from the album on 20 October 2020. It was written by Dan Searle alongside the rest of the band, and was produced by Searle and Josh Middleton.

A live orchestral version of "Animals" was recorded at Abbey Road Studios in London, being released onto the band's YouTube channel on 26 March 2021 as well as being able to be streamed exclusively on Amazon Music.

Composition
The song has been described by critics as a metalcore and a hard rock song with electronic influences. The track runs at 95 BPM and is in the key of C-sharp minor. It runs for four minutes and 4 seconds. The song was written by the band as well as being produced by band member Dan Searle who co-produced the song and the album alongside Josh Middleton.

Music video
The video for "Animals" was released on the same day as the song was released on 20 October 2020. It was directed by Dan Searle. 

Chris Krovatin of The Pit described the music video as "including flashes of beautiful and inspiring imagery that, while open to interpretation, are none the less devoid of any specific meaning...powerful imagery that at the end of the day is more about inspiration than trying to get across any real message, agenda, or allegiance."

As of February 2023, the song has 22 million views on YouTube.

Personnel
Credits adapted from Tidal.

Architects
 Sam Carter – lead vocals, lyricist, composition
 Josh Middleton – lead guitar, backing vocals, lyricist, composition, production
 Adam Christianson – rhythm guitar, backing vocals, lyricist, composition
 Alex "Ali" Dean – bass, keyboards, drum pad, lyricist, composition
 Dan Searle – drums, percussion, programming, lyricist, composition, production

Additional personnel
 Zakk Cervini – mixing

Charts

Weekly charts

Year-end charts

References

2020 singles
2020 songs
Architects (British band) songs
British hard rock songs
Epitaph Records singles